Dasylechia is a genus of robber flies in the family Asilidae. There is one described species in Dasylechia, D. atrox.

References

Further reading

 
 
 

Asilidae
Articles created by Qbugbot